Johannes 'Hans' Baur (19 June 1897 – 17 February 1993) was Adolf Hitler's pilot during the political campaigns of the early 1930s. He began his aviation career as a flying ace in World War I. He later became Hitler's personal pilot and leader of the Reichsregierung squadron. Apprehended by the Soviet Union at the end of World War II in Europe, he was imprisoned in the Soviet Union for ten years before he was extradited to France on 10 October 1955, where he was imprisoned until 1957. He died in Herrsching, Bavaria, in 1993.

World War I and interwar period
Baur was born in Ampfing, Kingdom of Bavaria. He was called up to the Bavarian Army in 1915, and trained in field artillery. He then joined the  Luftstreitkräfte (air force) as an artillery spotter. In 1918, Baur served in FA 295 as an Unteroffizier pilot of two-seater Hannover CL.III ground attack aircraft. His observer was Leutnant Georg Ritter von Hengl. Baur was credited with six confirmed and three unconfirmed victories against French aircraft beginning 17 July 1918. Vizefeldwebel Baur was awarded the Iron Cross First Class and the Bavarian Silver Bravery Medal for attacking a French formation of seven and downing two of the Spads that day. Baur would score his last victories on 29 October 1918. 

After the war, he joined the Freikorps under Franz von Epp. He went on to become a courier flier for the Bavarian airmail service. Beginning in 1922, he was a pilot for Bayrische Luftlloyd, and then Junkers Luftverkehr. In 1926, Baur became a pilot of Deutsche Luft Hansa. In the same year, he also became a member of the NSDAP (Nazi Party No. 48,113). On 1 April 1931, he flew the opening flight of the Berlin-Munich-Rome route, known as the Alpine flight, whose passengers included Nuntius Eugenio Pacelli, Arturo Toscanini and Tsar Boris III of Bulgaria.

Hitler's personal pilot
Hitler was the first politician to campaign by air travel, deciding that travel by plane was more efficient than travel by railway. Baur first served as his pilot during the 1932 General Election.

Hitler obtained his first private aeroplane, a Junkers Ju 52/3m with registration number D-2600 (Werk Nr. 4021), in 1933, after becoming German Chancellor. The same registration number continued to be used for all aircraft used by Hitler, even during the war years. The Ju 52 was named Immelmann II after the First World War pilot Max Immelmann. Baur was personally selected by Hitler to be his official pilot in 1933 and was consequently released from service by Luft Hansa.

Fliegerstaffel des Führers

Baur was appointed head of Hitler's personal squadron, initially based at Oberwiesenfeld, Munich. As the Luftwaffe was not yet officially established, Hitler wanted Baur to be able to command sufficient power and respect to assure his security, therefore, Baur was commissioned a Standartenführer (colonel) in the Schutzstaffel (SS No. 171,865) by Heinrich Himmler in October, 1933.

Baur was given the task of expanding and organising Hitler's personal squadron and the government "flying group". In 1934, Baur was promoted to the rank of SS-Oberführer. Hitler allowed Baur to fill his squadron with experienced Luft Hansa pilots, including Georg Betz who became co-pilot for Hitler's aircraft and Hans Baur's substitute. By 1937, Hitler had three Ju 52 airplanes for flight use. Then in 1937, Hitler obtained a new aircraft, the Focke-Wulf Fw 200 Condor which was named, "Immelmann III". The Condor had a much greater range and was faster than the Ju 52. In 1942, an improved model of the Condor was put into use for Hitler's travels and Baur continued to be his primary pilot. A Ju 290 was assigned to Hitler's renamed squadron, Fliegerstaffel des Führers (FdF) in late 1944. Modifications were completed by February 1945 at the FdF's base at Pocking, Bavaria. Baur tested the aircraft, but Hitler never flew in it. Still by the end of the war, Baur commanded a total of 40 different aircraft, including Ju 52, Condors, Ju 290 and the little Fieseler Fi 156 Storch.

Although he tried to convert Baur to vegetarianism, Hitler also invited him to the Reich Chancellery for his favourite meal of pork and dumplings for his 40th birthday, and gave him a Mercedes Benz to replace his personal Ford.

Führerbunker and Soviet detention
On 31 January 1944, Baur was promoted to SS-Brigadeführer (brigadier general) and major general of the police; and on 24 February 1945, he became an SS-Gruppenführer (major general) and Generalleutnant of the Police.

During the last days of the war, Baur was with Hitler in the Führerbunker. Baur had devised a plan to allow Hitler to escape from the Battle of Berlin; a Fieseler Fi 156 Storch was held on standby which could take off from an improvised airstrip in the Tiergarten, near the Brandenburg Gate. However, Hitler refused to leave Berlin. On 26 April 1945, the improvised landing strip was used by Hanna Reitsch to fly in Colonel-General Robert Ritter von Greim, appointed by Hitler as head of the Luftwaffe after Hermann Göring's dismissal. During the evening of 28 April, Reitsch flew von Greim out on the same road-strip to Plön.

On 29 April 1945, the Soviet Red Army launched an all-out attack on the centre of Berlin. The Soviet artillery opened up with intense fire in and around the Reich Chancellery area. That evening in the bunker complex below the Chancellery garden, Hitler said his farewell to his personal pilots, Baur and Betz. Baur pleaded with Hitler to leave Berlin. The men volunteered to fly Hitler out of Germany in a Ju 390 and to safety. It was in vain as Hitler turned Baur down, stating he had to stay in Berlin.

Baur stayed in the bunker complex until Hitler killed himself on the afternoon of 30 April. After Hitler's suicide, Baur found the improvised road-strip too pot-holed for use and overrun by the Soviet 3rd Shock Army. A plan was devised to escape out from Berlin to the Allies on the western side of the Elbe or to the German Army to the North. SS-Brigadeführer Wilhelm Mohnke split up the Reich Chancellery and Führerbunker soldiers and personnel into ten main groups. Baur, Betz and Martin Bormann left the Reich Chancellery as part of one of the groups. During the escape attempt, Baur was shot in the legs, and the wound was so serious that his right lower leg was later amputated in Posen on 10 June 1945, while a Soviet prisoner-of-war.

Baur was of great interest to his captors, who believed he might have flown Hitler to safety before the fall of Berlin. They also believed he had information concerning stolen art, specifically about the plundering of the Amber Room (Bernsteinzimmer) in Leningrad. He was taken to the Soviet Union and imprisoned there for ten years before being released on 10 October 1955. The French then imprisoned him until 1957.

Later life and book
Baur returned to West Germany and in 1957 wrote his autobiography Ich flog die Mächtigen der Erde (literally "I flew the mighty of the Earth").  Later, a lengthened version was published as Mit Mächtigen zwischen Himmel und Erde ("Between Heaven and Earth with the Mighty"). The French translation is  titled J'étais pilote de Hitler: Le sort du monde était entre mes mains ("I was Hitler's pilot: The fate of the world was in my hands.").

The book is a collection of Baur's eyewitness accounts of Hitler's daily activities and conversations.  It is unique because Hans Baur, as his private pilot and personal friend, was in Hitler's presence practically every day from 1933 to 1945. The book also includes an account of the events surrounding the arrest of Ernst Röhm, by Hitler himself, on 30 June 1934 at Bad Wiessee in which Baur took part. The book tells of Baur's dislike for Hermann Göring (whom Baur describes as a "thick-headed glutton"). Baur was one of the few people who was truly close to Hitler and was one of the last people to see him alive in the Berlin bunker. The book has since been translated into English – with the title "I was Hitler's Pilot" – and is an insider's account of Hitler's life and doings as leader of the German Reich.

Baur died in Germany on 17 February 1993.

Personal life
Hans Baur married Elfriede Baur in 1923. Their only daughter, Ingeborg, was born the following year. After Elfriede Baur's death from cancer in 1935, Baur married again, with Hitler as his best man. His second wife, Maria, by whom he had two daughters, died while he was in captivity in the Soviet Union. His third wife, Cresentia, survived him.

Decorations & awards
1914 Iron Cross 2nd Class 
1914 Iron Cross 1st Class 
Military Merit Cross (Bavaria) 3rd Class with Crown and Swords 
Ehrenbecher für den Sieger im Luftkampf  wiki Germany
Bavarian Military Merit Medal in Silver, July 1918 
Pilot/Observer Badge 
SA Sports Badge in Bronze, 1 December 1937 
Degen (SS), 1 December 1937 
Anschluss Medal 
Sudetenland Medal 
Danzig Cross 2nd Class, 24 October 1939 
Golden Party Badge 
SS Ehrendolch 
Honour Chevron for the Old Guard 
Order of the Crown (Romania), April 1942 
Order of the Crown of King Zvonimir, 1943

See also
List of SS-Gruppenführer

References

Citations

Bibliography
  
 
 
 
 
 
 
 Above the Lines: The Aces and Fighter Units of the German Air Service, Naval Air Service and Flanders Marine Corps, 1914–1918. Norman Franks, Frank W. Bailey, Russell Guest. Grub Street, 1993. , .
 

1897 births
1993 deaths
People from Mühldorf (district)
People from the Kingdom of Bavaria
Military personnel of Bavaria
Luftstreitkräfte personnel
German World War II pilots
German prisoners of war in World War II held by the Soviet Union
SS-Gruppenführer
Recipients of the Iron Cross (1914), 1st class
Recipients of the Order of the Crown of King Zvonimir
Commander's Crosses of the Order of Merit of the Republic of Hungary (military)
Recipients of the Order of the Crown (Romania)
Recipients of the Order of the Cross of Liberty, 1st Class
Recipients of the Military Merit Cross (Bavaria)
Waffen-SS personnel
Burials at the Westfriedhof (Munich)
20th-century Freikorps personnel
People extradited from the Soviet Union
People extradited to France
German amputees
German World War I flying aces